Joseph Timothy Durrell (born 15 March 1953) is an English former professional footballer who played as a winger for West Ham United, Bristol City, Cardiff City and Gillingham between 1971 and 1977.

References

1953 births
Living people
English footballers
Footballers from Stepney
Association football wingers
English Football League players
Gillingham F.C. players
Bristol City F.C. players
Cardiff City F.C. players
West Ham United F.C. players
Lincoln City F.C. players